Thomas Wilson Sons & Co. was a British shipping company, founded in 1840, It evolved from a joint venture formed by merchants Thomas Wilson, John Beckinton and two unrelated partners named Hudson in 1822.

The company expanded and by the early 20th century operated a relatively large fleet, but in 1906 part of the operation was merged with the North Eastern Railway creating Wilson's & North Eastern Railway Shipping Co. Ltd and later in 1916 the remaining company was sold to Sir John Ellerman who created Ellerman's Wilson Line which continued to trade until closed in 1973.

Background
1822–1836 Beckington, Wilson and Company

None of the partners came from shipping background but were quick to see the opportunity of becoming involved in the industry and they acquired their first sailing ship the "Thomas and Ann" in 1825, and a schooner "Swift" in 1831.

1836–1840 Wilson, Hudson and Company

In about 1836 John Beckington dropped out of the partnership and the new company was formed.

History
1840–1850 Thomas Wilson and Company

The two Hudson partners retired in 1840–41 allowing Thomas Wilson to take full control. He brought his eldest son David into the business as his partner.

1850–1916 Thomas Wilson Sons and Company
(became a Limited company in 1891)

In 1850 his other sons Charles and Arthur joined and became active partners, the name changing to Thomas Wilson Sons and Company, though usually known as the Wilson Line of Hull.

Thomas died in 1869 and the company was taken over by his sons Charles and Arthur Wilson, with David remaining a silent partner. A few years later the brothers were beginning to question the ability of their own sons to continue running the firm and brought in a non-family member, Oswald Sanderson, to become the new Managing Director.

In 1878 the company purchased the seven ship fleet of Brownlow Marsdin and Co., bringing the Wilson fleet to 52 ships.

In 1903 23 ships were purchased from Bailey & Leetham.

In 1906 part of the operation was merged with the North Eastern Railway creating Wilson's & North Eastern Railway Shipping Co. Ltd.

In 1906 the company purchased the shares in the ailing local firm Earle's Shipbuilding and ordered ships from them.

1916–1973 Ellerman's Wilson Line

The company was sold to Sir John Ellerman in 1916, owner of the successful Ellerman Line and supposedly the richest man in Britain at the time. There can be little doubt that the loss of three of its largest and most prestigious ships to enemy action (Aaro and Calypso sunk; Eskimo captured) in a three-week period in the summer contributed greatly to the Wilson family's decision to sell the company. Though it kept the Wilson name (Ellerman's Wilson Line of Hull) and continued for several years, it never saw the same success, despite a brief revival in the 1950s, and was eventually closed in 1973 when the Ellerman company turned its focus elsewhere.

Development
From a background in iron importing, the focus was on steam shipping, still in its early stages and eventually saw the company become a prominent figure in modern steam shipping. Initially, the firm concentrated on Swedish iron ore importing for the Sheffield iron trades but gradually turned to focus on the shipping lines all over the world, with Hull becoming one of the most significant ports to flourish under the advent of steam. Previously getting out of the Humber Estuary was difficult despite the convenient location of Hull, but with steam, it became easy to reach the sea and navigate around Britain.

Relevance
At one time the firm was well on its way to becoming the world's largest private shipowner. The company stands out as one of interest in the maritime and business world of the period, as it provides an example of the changing fortunes of a family business. It has been suggested that Thomas Wilson is a good example of the emergence of specialist shipowners at this time.

Livery
Funnels: Red with black top.

Hull: black (Thomas Wilson Sons) or dark green (Ellerman's Wilson) but occasionally white where the vessel had refrigerated capacity.

Passenger vessels of Thomas Wilson Sons & Co. / Ellerman's Wilson Line

See also
Earle's Shipbuilding
John Ellerman
Oswald Sanderson
Thomas Wilson
Wilson's & North Eastern Railway Shipping Co. Ltd

References

Bibliography

 Greenway, Ambrose (1986); A Century of North Sea Passenger Steamers ; Shepperton, Ian Allan ; .

 Haws, Duncan (1993); Merchant Fleets – Britain's Railway Steamers – Eastern & North Western + Zeeland and Stena ; Hereford, TCL Publications ; .

External links

Glasgow Archives Wilson Line collection
Hull in print history
Hull Maritime museum
University of Hull archives

Defunct shipping companies of the United Kingdom
Transport companies established in 1822
Defunct companies of Kingston upon Hull
1822 establishments in England
British companies established in 1822